Thomas David Bannatyne-Billson is an English footballer who plays as a goalkeeper for Kidderminster Harriers, on loan from Championship team Coventry City.

Career
Born in Shrewsbury, Billson started his career with Coventry City, during his time at the club he had a loan spell at Barwell.

He made his professional debut starting on 15 September 2020 in a 5-4 penalty shootout loss in an EFL Cup Second Round game with Gillingham.

In July 2021, Billson joined EFL League Two side Scunthorpe United on loan for the season. On 11 January 2022, Billson was recalled from the loan by parent club Coventry City.

On 14 November 2022, Billson joined National League North side Kidderminster Harriers on a one-month loan deal.

Career statistics

References

External links
Tom Billson player profile at ccfc.co.uk

2000 births
Living people
English footballers
Association football goalkeepers
Coventry City F.C. players
Barwell F.C. players
Scunthorpe United F.C. players
Kidderminster Harriers F.C. players
English Football League players
National League (English football) players